Phil L. Hansen (September 5, 1923 – August 3, 1992) was an American politician who served as the Attorney General of Utah from 1965 to 1969. He served in the United States military during World War II.

He died of heart failure on August 3, 1992, in Murray, Utah at age 68.

References

1923 births
1992 deaths
Utah Attorneys General
Utah Democrats
American military personnel of World War II